MTV Unplugged is a live album by Bob Dylan, released on May 2, 1995, by Columbia Records (reissued in 2007 by Sony). It documents Dylan's appearance on the then-highly popular MTV Unplugged television series, recorded at Sony Music Studios in New York City on November 17 and 18, 1994. It gave Dylan his best sales in years, reaching US No. 23 and going gold, while hitting No. 10 in the UK. The performance was released on DVD in March 2004, including a 5.1 surround sound mix.

Track listing
All songs written by Bob Dylan.

 

All releases are longer than the original MTV broadcast, which did not include Tombstone Blues, John Brown, Desolation Row or Love Minus Zero/No Limit.

Personnel
Bob Dylan – guitar, vocals, harmonica

Additional musicians
Bucky Baxter – Dobro, pedal steel, steel guitar, mandolin
Tony Garnier – upright bass
John Jackson – guitar
Brendan O'Brien – Hammond organ
Winston Watson – drums

Technical personnel
Greg Calbi – mastering
Ed Cherney – mixing
Randy Ezratty – engineering
Kim Gaucher – illustrations
Scott Hull – mastering
Frank Micelotta – photography
Jeff Rosen – executive producer
Don Was – mixing
Allen Weinberg – art direction

Certifications

References

1995 live albums
1995 video albums
Bob Dylan live albums
Columbia Records live albums
Columbia Records video albums
Live video albums
Mtv Unplugged (Dylan, Bob album)
Bob Dylan video albums